Dan II (? – 1 June 1432) was a voivode of the principality of Wallachia, ruling an extraordinary five times, and succeeded four times by Radu II Chelul, his rival for the throne. Of those five periods on the throne of Wallachia (1420–1421, 1421–1423, 1423–1424, 1426–1427, and 1427–1431), four were within a period of only seven years.

Early life 
Dan was the son of Dan I of Wallachia. His father was the eldest son and successor of Radu I of Wallachia. After Dan I was murdered in 1387, his brother, Mircea, ascended the throne. Dan was loyal to his uncle during Mircea's reign. Mircea was the first ruler of Wallachia to be forced to pay an annual tribute to the Ottoman Empire. He made his only legitimate son, Michael I, his co-ruler.Dan appears first in the records leading a contingent sent by his uncle Mircea I to assist Musa Celebi in taking Adrianople during the Ottoman civil war in 1411.

After Michael succeeded Mircea (who died on 4 February 1418), Dan laid claim to Wallachia. The Ottomans defeated Michael in 1419, forcing him to pay tribute and to cede Giurgiu and other fortresses along the Danube to them. The Wallachian boyars started to defect to Dan. After Michael did not respect his treaty with the Ottomans, Dan broke into Wallachia in early 1420. Initially, Michael could resist. However, Ottoman troops joined Dan, enabling him to defeat Michael and his Hungarian allies in the summer of 1420.

Reign 
Dan II first took the throne in 1420, losing it in 1421, but regaining it that same year. He was primarily able to regain the throne many times because he was an able military commander in the field. In 1423, Dan II led an army against the invading Ottoman Turks, defeating them in battle. The Ottomans were invading in an effort to place Radu II back on the throne. In 1425, he again defeated the Ottomans, winning an important victory in a battle that was the first recorded mention of Wallachia using mercenaries in their army. In that battle, Dan II had employed a large number of Bulgarian soldiers. In the spring of 1427, Dan II removes Radu II from the throne for the last time, again defeating the Ottomans in battle,  taking back the fortress at Giurgiu. In all likelihood, Dan II killed Radu II either during or after that battle, as the latter disappears from historical records afterwards. However, written accounts of the time are sparse at best, and it is not known for certain. On 3 June 1428, Dan II led an army against the Ottomans at Golubac Fortress, which ended with a treaty that would allow Dan II a semi-peaceful rule until 1432.

In 1432 his country was invaded by a large Ottoman army. Dan was defeated and killed in battle. He was succeeded by Alexandru I Aldea, a son of Mircea cel Batran, who would reign until his death from illness in 1436, and with him being replaced by Vlad II Dracul, father to Vlad Tepes. Dan II's son, Basarab II, would replace Vlad Dracul's son Mircea II in 1443. However, his son lacked the military ability of his father and would lose the throne within a year to Vlad Dracul.

Infante Pedro, Duke of Coimbra, an indefatigable traveler, possibly the most well-traveled prince of his time, and brother of Henry the Navigator, met with Dan II of Wallachia during Pedro's service to Sigismund, Holy Roman Emperor.

Family

References

Sources

External links
Wallachian Ruler Timeline
Wallachian Historical Atlas
Count Dracula; The Truth, Rule of Wallachia History

|-

Rulers of Wallachia
1432 deaths
House of Dănești
Year of birth unknown
Romanian people of Serbian descent